"Willow Weep for Me" is a popular song composed in 1932 by Ann Ronell, who also wrote the lyrics. The song form is AABA, written in  time, although occasionally adapted for  waltz time.

One account of the inspiration for the song is that, during her time at Radcliffe College, Ronell "had been struck by the loveliness of the willow trees on campus, and this simple observation became the subject of an intricate song."

The song was rejected by publishers for several reasons. First, the song is dedicated to George Gershwin. A dedication to another writer was disapproved of at the time, so the first person presented with the song for publication, Saul Bornstein, passed it to Irving Berlin, who accepted it. Other reasons stated for its slow acceptance are that it was written by a woman and that its construction was unusually complex for a composition that was targeted at a commercial audience (i.e., radio broadcast, record sales and sheet music sales). An implied tempo change in the fifth bar, a result of a switch from the two eighth notes and an eighth-note triplet opening in each of the first four bars to just four eighth notes opening the fifth, then back to two eighth notes and an eighth-note triplet opening the sixth bar, which then has a more offset longer note than any of the previous bars, was one cause of Bornstein's concern.

Versions
It is mostly known as a jazz standard, having been recorded first by Ted Fio Rito (with vocal by Muzzy Marcellino) in October 1932 and by Paul Whiteman (with vocal by Irene Taylor) the following month. Both were hits in December 1932.
Notable recordings continued into the 1950s, starting with Stan Kenton's version with June Christy.

Some -time versions are on recordings by Phil Woods (Musique du Bois, 1974) and Dr. Lonnie Smith (Jungle Soul, 2006).

It was a major hit for the British duo Chad & Jeremy. In January 1965, it reached No. 15 on the Billboard Hot 100, and went to No. 1 on the Adult Contemporary chart. It was included on their Yesterday's Gone album and many subsequent compilations.

Other versions
Version Paul Whiteman with Irene Taylor (1932)
Greta Keller (1933)
Stan Kenton with June Christy (1946)
Art Tatum (1949)
Billie Holiday - Lady Sings the Blues (1956)
Red Garland - Groovy (1957)
Tommy Flanagan - Overseas (1957)
Vince Guaraldi - A Flower Is a Lovesome Thing (1957)
Cal Tjader - Cal Tjader (1957)
Frank Sinatra – Frank Sinatra Sings for Only the Lonely (1958)
David Newman with Ray Charles - Fathead (1958)
Wynton Kelly - Kelly Blue (1959)
Nina Simone - The Amazing Nina Simone (1959)
The Coasters – One by One (1960)
Lou Rawls with Les McCann - Stormy Monday (1962)
Julie London - Love On The Rocks (1963)
Sam Cooke - Mr. Soul (1963)
Lena Horne - Feelin' Good (1965)
George Benson - It's Uptown (1966)
The Thad Jones/Mel Lewis Orchestra – Presenting Thad Jones/Mel Lewis and the Jazz Orchestra (1966)
Alan Price Set - single (1966)
Booker T. & the M.G.'s - Soul Limbo (1968)
Wes Montgomery - Willow Weep For Me (1969) (posthumous, from 1965 sessions)
Oscar Peterson and Harry Sweets Edison – Oscar Peterson and Harry Edison (1974)
Phil Woods with Jaki Byard – Musique du Bois (1974)
Dorothy Donegan – The Many Faces of Dorothy Donegan (1975)
Pat Martino – We'll Be Together Again (1976)
Ryo Fukui – Scenery (1976)
Clark Terry – Clark After Dark (1978) 
Shoji Yokouchi Trio plus Yuri Tashiro - Greensleeves (1978)
Steve Miller – Born 2 B Blue (1988)
Etta James - Time After Time (1995)
Andy Bey – Ballads, Blues, and Bey (1995)
David Sanborn – Pearls (1995)
Tony Bennett (1996)
 Tin Hat Trio - The Rodeo Eroded (2002)
Bennie Wallace with Kenny Barron – The Nearness of You (2003)
Anne Hampton Callaway - Blue in the Night (2006)
Bill McBirnie with Robi Botos – Mercy (2010)
Vocal Spectrum - Vocal Spectrum III  (2011)
Mark Whitfield - Live & Uncut (2017)
Jackie Bornstein - Women in Jazz: An Invitation to Freedom (2022)

Chart history
Paul Whiteman

Ted Fio Rito

Chad & Jeremy

Carmel cover

See also
List of 1930s jazz standards
List of number-one adult contemporary singles of 1965 (U.S.)

References

External links
 Jazzstandards.com
 

1932 songs
1964 singles
1930s jazz standards
Songs written by Ann Ronell
Chad & Jeremy songs
Billie Holiday songs
Louis Armstrong songs
Lena Horne songs
Frank Sinatra songs
Nina Simone songs
Ella Fitzgerald songs
Alan Price songs
Song recordings produced by Shel Talmy